Thomas Philip Le Fanu (1784–1845) was an Irish Dean in the first half of the 19th century. He was the son of Joseph Le Fanu and Alicia Sheridan, and the father of Joseph Sheridan Le Fanu and William Richard Le Fanu. He married Emma Lucretia Dobbin.

He was Dean of Emly  and rector of Abington, Limerick from 1826 to 1845. Prior to this position, he was chaplain at the Royal Hibernian Military School in Phoenix Park, Dublin.

He died in Abington Glebe House on 20 June 1845. He was buried in the grounds of Abington Church.

References

Irish Anglicans
Deans of Emly
1784 births
1845 deaths
Thomas